345 Park Avenue  is a  skyscraper in the Midtown Manhattan neighborhood of New York City. It occupies an entire city block bounded by Park Avenue, Lexington Avenue, 51st Street, and 52nd Street.

Completed in 1969, with 44 floors, the building was designed by Emery Roth & Sons. The building is assigned its own ZIP Code, 10154; it was one of 41 buildings in Manhattan that had their own ZIP Codes . It is near the Racquet and Tennis Club and Park Avenue Plaza to the northeast; the Seagram Building to the north; 599 Lexington Avenue to the northeast; and St. Bartholomew's Episcopal Church and the General Electric Building to the south.

It is built on the site of the Hotel Ambassador, which had opened in 1921. It was sold to Sheraton Hotels in 1958 and renamed the Sheraton-East. It was demolished in 1966.

Exteriors of 345 Park Avenue were used as the headquarters of CSC and Continental Corp. in the Aaron Sorkin series Sports Night from 1998 to 2000.

Tenants
 The Blackstone Group
 Consulate General of Ireland
 Capital Trust
 Deutsche Bank
 Enterprise Ireland
 Tourism Ireland
 KPMG (since the building opened)
 Loeb & Loeb LLP
 National Football League (since 2012)
 Piper Jaffray
 Bord Bia
 ClothesFlow.Co
 The Rudin Management Company, Inc.
 Wafra Inc.
 JP Morgan

See also
List of tallest buildings in New York City

References

External links
345 Park Avenue

1969 establishments in New York City
Skyscraper office buildings in Manhattan
Headquarters in the United States
Office buildings completed in 1969
Leadership in Energy and Environmental Design gold certified buildings
Emery Roth buildings
Midtown Manhattan
Park Avenue